Ilias Michalopoulos (born 15 October 1985) is a Greek footballer.

Career
Born in Athens, Michalopoulos began his playing career by signing with Atromitos in October 2001.

References

External links
 Profile at Onsports.gr
 

1985 births
Living people
Atromitos F.C. players
PAS Giannina F.C. players
Veria F.C. players
Kallithea F.C. players
Panthrakikos F.C. players
AEK Larnaca FC players
Super League Greece players
Cypriot First Division players
Greek expatriate footballers
Expatriate footballers in Cyprus
Association football midfielders
Footballers from Athens
Greek footballers